Alexandros Diomedes (3 January 1875 – 11 November 1950) was a governor of the Central Bank of Greece who became Prime Minister of Greece upon the death of Themistoklis Sophoulis.

Diomedes was born in Athens, Greece to an Arvanite family from Spetses on 3 January 1875. His grandfather was former Prime Minister Diomidis Kiriakos. He studied law and economics in Weimar and Paris and earned a doctorate from the University of Berlin. In 1905, he became a professor at the National and Kapodistrian University of Athens. He was a member of the Athens Academy.

Diomedes was appointed prefect ("nomarch") of the Attica and Boeotia Prefecture in 1909. In 1910, he was elected to the Hellenic Parliament under the banner of the Liberal Party. From 1912 to 1915 and again in 1922 he served as Minister for Finance. Diomedes became Governor of the National Bank of Greece in 1923 and Governor of the Bank of Greece in 1928.

Diomedes became Prime Minister upon the death of Sophoulis. It was during his brief term in office (28 June 1949 – 6 January 1950) that the Greek Civil War was concluded. He was forced to resign amid a scandal involving his Minister for Transport, Hatzipanos. He died later in that same year (11 November 1950).

Besides being an economist and politician, Diomedes also authored several literary works, including a two-volume work on Byzantine Empire studies.

Along with his wife Julia, Diomidis left part of his fortune to the Greek state for the purposes of establishing a botanical garden in Athens, opened in 1952 as the "Julia and Alexander N. Diomides Botanic Garden".

Sources 

1875 births
1950 deaths
20th-century prime ministers of Greece
Liberal Party (Greece) politicians
Politicians from Athens
Prime Ministers of Greece
Academic staff of the National and Kapodistrian University of Athens
Arvanites
Members of the Academy of Athens (modern)
Finance ministers of Greece
Greek MPs 1910–1912
Greek MPs 1912–1915
Greek MPs 1915, 1917–1920
Governors of the Bank of Greece
Businesspeople from Athens